Prince Ernst Rüdiger Camillo von Starhemberg, often known simply as Prince Starhemberg, (Eferding, 10 May 1899 – Schruns, 15 March 1956) was an Austrian nationalist and politician who helped introduce austrofascism and install a clerical fascist dictatorship in Austria in the interwar period. A fierce opponent of Anschluss, he fled Austria when the Nazis invaded the country and briefly served with the Free French and British forces in World War II.

Starhemberg was a leader of the Heimwehr and later of the Fatherland Front. He served in the Bundesrat between 1920 and 1930, as Minister of Interior in 1930, Vice-Chancellor in 1934 and subsequently Acting Chancellor and Leader of the Front after the murder of Engelbert Dollfuß, relinquishing the former position after a few days. Disenchanted by the moderate ways of Chancellor Kurt Schuschnigg, he was ousted from power in 1936, when the Heimwehr was dissolved, and fled the country after the Anschluss to avoid retaliation from vengeful Nazis.

He lived in exile in Switzerland and served with the western Allies in the British and Free French air forces for a short period at the beginning of World War II, but became disenchanted with them when they entered into an alliance with Joseph Stalin's Soviet Union, that he viewed as equally evil as the Nazis. He left for Argentina where he spent the next thirteen years in exile. He died during an extended visit to Austria in 1956.

He was the 1,163rd Knight of the Order of the Golden Fleece, Austrian Order.

Biography
Born in Eferding, Upper Austria, in 1899, into the illustrious House of Starhemberg, which hailed from a long line of Austrian nobles and inherited the title of prince. He was the oldest son of Prince Ernst Rüdiger von Starhemberg and Princess Franziska von Starhemberg, born Countess Larisch von Moennich. He was a collateral relative to Field Marshal Count Ernst Rüdiger von Starhemberg. During World War I, he served on the Italian Front, and in 1921, he was a member of Freikorps Oberland.

Seeking election to the Bundesrat, the representation of Austrian states (Länder) at age 21, Starhemberg became a proponent of Catholic and conservative politics, joined the Heimatschutz and quickly becoming a leader of one of its local branches. He also became an admirer of Benito Mussolini and his fascist government. During the early 1920s, Starhemberg traveled to Germany and had contacts with the nascent Nazi movement. Adolf Hitler actively used Starhemberg's status as an Austrian noble to try to improve the party's image and to attract wealthy and influential backers to its ranks. After seeing the failed Beer Hall Putsch of 1923, Starhemberg became disenchanted with Nazism and returned to Austria. Rejoining the Heimatschutz, Starhemberg became its national leader in 1930 and actively campaigned to turn Austria into a more organised state. Eventually, Starhemberg's movement became powerful enough to influence the government, and he was appointed by the chancellor as Minister of the Interior in September 1930. Starhemberg resigned his position shortly thereafter, however, when the Heimatblock, the Heimwehr'''s political wing, won only eight seats in elections for the Nationalrat.

When the conservative Engelbert Dollfuß became Chancellor of Austria in 1932, Starhemberg once again gained governmental power. At Dollfuß's request, Starhemberg successfully worked to combine a number of right-wing groups into a single political entity. The result was the powerful Fatherland Front, which saw its creation in late 1933, followed by the authoritarian May Constitution of 1934. For his efforts, Starhemberg became Dollfuß's Vice-Chancellor under the new rule. Upon Dollfuß's assassination two months later during a failed coup by the Nazis, Starhemberg briefly came to head the government and the Fatherland Front. President Wilhelm Miklas proclaimed Austria was not yet ready for a Heimwehr Cabinet and called a cabinet meeting in Vienna's Ballhouse, surrounded by barbed wire and government troops, to restrain suspicious members of the Heimwehr, which claimed that the Nazi coup had been foiled only through its courage. Miklas appointed Kurt von Schuschnigg Chancellor instead on 29 July. Starhemberg officially supported the compromise and his office as Vice-Chancellor and was appointed Minister of Public Security as well.

With those positions, Starhemberg was in effect the second-most powerful man in Austria. During that period, the regime fought to keep Austria an independent state by support from France, the United Kingdom and Italy, with crackdowns on Austrian Nazis and others favouring a union with Germany. The idea of union with Germany had been popular among socialists as well as conservatives although the Treaty of Saint-Germain-en-Laye (1919), which Austria signed at the end of World War II, forbade it.

In 1936, Starhemberg's disagreements with Schuschnigg, who, inspired by the appeasement policies of the western democracies, wanted to improve relations with Nazi Germany, rather than risk invasion by a far stronger Wehrmacht and face possible desertion by Hitler's newfound ally, Mussolini. In March 1936, Starhemberg was forced to relinquish his position as Federal leader of the Fatherland Front, which was dissolved, as was the Heimwehr, and on 14 May, he was ousted from the government.

After the Anschluss in March 1938, which saw much of the Fatherland Front's leadership purged (Schuschnigg himself was detained and shipped to a concentration camp), Starhemberg escaped to Switzerland. He later served in the British and the Free French air forces for a short period at the beginning of World War II. However, he became disenchanted with the Western Allies when they made an alliance with Joseph Stalin's Soviet Union, which Starhemberg viewed as equally evil as the Nazis. In 1942, Starhemberg decided to leave the war and travelled to Argentina, where he spent the next 13 years. In 1955, the year of the ousting of Juan Perón, who was also a fervent admirer of fascism and Mussolini, by a military coup, Starhemberg returned to Austria.

Starhemberg died in Schruns, Vorarlberg, during an extended visit to Austria in 1956 while he was staying at a spa in Schruns. During a walk, he was photographed against his will by a reporter who worked at a communist newspaper, became enraged and attacked the photographer with his walking stick. However, he suffered a cardiac arrest and died.

Marriages
Starhemberg married two times:
Marie-Elisabeth Altgräfin zu Salm-Reifferscheidt-Raitz (Donaueschingen, 1 March 1908 – Gmunden, 10 April 1984), married in Vienna on 9 September 1928, annulled on 27 November 1937. She had no children but adopted, in 1973 as her heir, a cousin, Maria Elisabeth (Marielies) Leopoldine Hippolyta, Altgräfin'' zu Salm-Reiferscheidt-Raitz (born 1931).
Nora Gregor (Görz, 3 February 1901 – Santiago, 20 January 1949), Austrian-Jewish stage and film actress, married in Vienna on 2 December 1937. They had one child, who was born prior to their marriage, Heinrich Rüdiger Gregor (1934-1997), known from 1937 as Heinrich Rüdiger Karl Georg Franciscus Graf von Starhemberg, later, upon the death of his father, became 8th Fürst von Starhemberg. He died unmarried and without issue so his title was inherited by his cousin Georg Adam (b. 1961) who is the current Prince and Head of the family.

Notes

References

External links

1899 births
1956 deaths
20th-century Chancellors of Austria
People from Eferding District
Collaborators who participated in the Beer Hall Putsch
20th-century Freikorps personnel
Vice-Chancellors of Austria
Ernst Rudiger Starhemberg
Austrian Ministers of Defence
Austrian Roman Catholics
Austrian princes
Austro-Hungarian military personnel of World War I
Austrofascists
Knights of the Golden Fleece
Fatherland Front politicians